Giovanni Canova (27 July 1880 – 28 October 1960) was an Italian fencer. He won a gold medal at the 1920 Summer Olympics and a bronze at the 1924 Summer Olympics.

References

1880 births
1960 deaths
People from Canicattì
Italian male fencers
Olympic fencers of Italy
Fencers at the 1920 Summer Olympics
Fencers at the 1924 Summer Olympics
Olympic gold medalists for Italy
Olympic bronze medalists for Italy
Olympic medalists in fencing
Medalists at the 1920 Summer Olympics
Medalists at the 1924 Summer Olympics
Sportspeople from the Province of Agrigento